The Incinerator (also known as Linceneritore) is a 1984 Italian horror comedy film directed by Pier Francesco Boscaro dagli Ambrosi.

The movie features music composed and recorded by Richard Benson who also has a small role as the leader of a street gang.

Plot
A demented hunchback experiments on lab animals, a countess and her two bodyguards, and a hooker. His victims are killed, cut up, put in garbage bags, picked up by city garbarge trucks, and burnt in the municipal incinerator.

References

External links

Giallo films
1984 films
Italian comedy horror films
1980s comedy horror films
1984 comedy films
1980s Italian-language films
1980s Italian films